Orr Glacier is a tributary glacier which drains the large cirque between Mount Moody and Mount Bernstein in the Lanterman Range, Bowers Mountains, and flows west into Rennick Glacier. Mapped by United States Geological Survey (USGS) from ground surveys and U.S. Navy air photos, 1960–62. Named by Advisory Committee on Antarctic Names (US-ACAN) for Maj. Thomas L. Orr, USA, Asst. Logistics Officer on the staff of the Commander, U.S. Naval Support Force, Antarctica, 1968 and 1969.

Glaciers of Pennell Coast